The 2013–14 season was Dynamo's 23rd Ukrainian Premier League season, and their second season under manager Oleh Blokhin, who was replaced by Serhii Rebrov in April 2014. Dynamo Kyiv finished the season 4th in the Ukrainian Premier League, won the Ukrainian Cup and reached the Round of 32 in the UEFA Europa League.

Squad

Out on loan

Retired number(s)

12 –  Club Supporters (the 12th Man)

Transfers

Summer

In:

Out:

 

<ref>{{cite web|title=ARTEM MILEVSKIY GAZï¿½ANTEPSPORDA|url=http://www.gaziantepspor.org.tr/tr/haber-detay.asp?Sayfa=ARTEM+MILEVSKIY+GAZ%EF%BF%BDANTEPSPOR%27DA&Id=4268|publisher=Gaziantepspor|accessdate=7 March 2014|language=Turkish|archive-url=https://web.archive.org/web/20140307143820/http://www.gaziantepspor.org.tr/tr/haber-detay.asp?Sayfa=ARTEM+MILEVSKIY+GAZ%EF%BF%BDANTEPSPOR%27DA&Id=4268|archive-date=7 March 2014|url-status=dead}}</ref>

Winter

In:

Out:

 

Friendlies

United Tournament

 Standings 

Matches

Competitions

Ukrainian Premier League

Results summary

Results by round

Results

League table

Ukrainian Cup

Europa League

Qualifying rounds

Group stage

Knockout phase

Squad statistics

Appearances and goals

|-
|colspan="14"|Players who left Dynamo Kyiv on loan during the season :|-
|colspan="14"|Players who left Dynamo Kyiv during the season :''
|}

Goalscorers

Disciplinary record

Notes
Notes

References

External links
Official website

Dynamo Kyiv
FC Dynamo Kyiv seasons
Dynamo Kyiv